Thionyl fluoride is the inorganic compound with the formula . This colourless gas is mainly of theoretical interest, but it is a product of the degradation of sulfur hexafluoride, an insulator in electrical equipment.  The molecule adopts a distorted pyramidal structure, with Cs symmetry. The S-O and S-F distances are 1.42 and 1.58 Å, respectively. The O-S-F and F-S-F angles are 106.2 and 92.2°, respectively.   Thionyl chloride and thionyl bromide have similar structures, although these compounds are liquid at room temperature.  Mixed halides are also known, such as SOClF, thionyl chloride fluoride.

Synthesis and reactions
Thionyl fluoride can be produced by the reaction of thionyl chloride with fluoride sources such as antimony trifluoride.
3 SOCl2 + 2SbF3 → 3SOF2 + 2SbCl3

Alternatively, it arises via the fluorination of sulfur dioxide:
SO2 + PF5   →   SOF2 +  POF3

Thionyl fluoride arises as a fleeting intermediate from the decomposition of sulfur hexafluoride as the result of electrical discharges which generate sulfur tetrafluoride.  SF4 hydrolyzes to give thionyl fluoride, which in turn hydrolyzes further as described below.

As expected from the behavior of the other thionyl halides, this compound hydrolyzes readily, giving hydrogen fluoride and sulfur dioxide:
SOF2  +  H2O   →  2 HF  +  SO2

In contrast to thionyl chloride and bromide, thionyl fluoride is not useful for halogenation.  The related derivative, sulfur tetrafluoride is however useful for that purpose.

References

External links

Thionyl compounds
Oxyfluorides
Sulfur(IV) compounds
Sulfur oxohalides